Spi(e)gelman(n) (German for "mirror man") is a surname. Notable people with the surname include:
Art Spiegelman, American comics artist
James Spigelman, Chief Justice of New South Wales
Jeffrey Spiegelman, American politician
Joel Spiegelman, American composer 
Mortimer Spiegelman, American statistician
Nadja Spiegelman, American writer
Sol Spiegelman, American microbiologist
Vladek Spiegelman, father of Art Spiegelman and subject of his graphic novel Maus

See also 
 Spiegel
 Spiegler

German-language surnames
Jewish surnames
Yiddish-language surnames